The House of Gallardo (Spanish: Casa Gallardo) is a building located in Madrid, Spain.

Projected by Federico Arias Rey, it is one of the relatively few modernista buildings preserved in Madrid. It was declared Bien de Interés Cultural in 1997. It is located in  2, near the plaza de España.

References

External links 

Buildings and structures in Argüelles neighborhood, Madrid
Art Nouveau architecture in Spain
Bien de Interés Cultural landmarks in Madrid